Liceo Requínoa is a Chilean high school located in Requínoa, Cachapoal Province, Chile.

References 

Educational institutions established in 1999
Secondary schools in Chile
Schools in Cachapoal Province
1999 establishments in Chile